Linter is a municipality located in the Belgian province of Flemish Brabant. The municipality comprises the towns of Drieslinter, Melkwezer, Neerhespen (where the canine school of the Belgian police is situated), Neerlinter, Orsmaal-Gussenhoven, Overhespen and Wommersom. On January 1, 2006, Linter had a total population of 7,037. The total area is 36.38 km² which gives a population density of 193 inhabitants per km².

The main economic activities of Linter are agricultural and commercial activities.

Demographics

Languages
 Standard Dutch
 Getelands dialects, which are transitional Brabantian-Limburgish dialects.

References

External links
 
Official website - Available only in Dutch
Gazetteer Entry

Municipalities of Flemish Brabant